

Events

January events
 January 1 – Opening to traffic of the Gotthard Tunnel, completing the Gotthardbahn in Switzerland.
 January 2 – Building northward from San Diego, California Southern Railroad tracks reach Fallbrook, California.
 January 9 – The first train from Cincinnati, Ohio, on the Cincinnati Northern Railway, departs for Dayton, Ohio.
 January 12 – The first train between Cincinnati, Ohio, and Dayton, Ohio, delayed by poor trackwork on the Cincinnati Northern Railway, arrives in Dayton.

March events
 March 6 – Regular service begins on the Cincinnati Northern Railway between Cincinnati, Ohio, and Dayton, Ohio.
 March 27 – Continuing its northward construction, California Southern Railroad tracks reach Temecula, California.

April events 
 April 17 – The St. Clairsville and Northern Railway, connecting St. Clairsville to Barton, Ohio, is incorporated.

May events 
 May 15 – Lehrter Stadtbahnhof, the precursor to the current Berlin Hauptbahnhof, opens in Germany.

July events 
 July 29 – Narrow gauge Catskill Mountain Railway opens to carry passengers from Hudson River steamboats to connections at Palenville, New York to the Catskill Mountain House destination resort.

August events 
 August 21 – The first California Southern Railroad train from National City reaches Colton, California.
 August 23 – The first Canadian Pacific Railway train arrives in Regina, Saskatchewan, Canada.
 August 24 – The Lake Shore and Michigan Southern Railway leases the 97 mile (156 km) long Fort Wayne, Jackson and Saginaw Railroad.

September events 
 September 1 – The Lake Shore and Michigan Southern Railway begins operations over the leased Fort Wayne, Jackson and Saginaw Railroad.

October events
 October 10 – Departure 'Train Éclair de luxe', the test train for the Express d'Orient, the later Orient Express, from Paris (Gare de Strasbourg) to Wien (return arrival at Paris on October 14).
 October 16 – The Nickel Plate Road runs its first trains over the entire system between Buffalo, New York, and Chicago, Illinois.
 October 25 – The Seney Syndicate sells the Nickel Plate Road to William H. Vanderbilt for US$7.2 million.

Unknown date events
 Spring – The Atlantic and Pacific Railroad, later to become part of the Atchison, Topeka and Santa Fe Railroad, building westward from Albuquerque, New Mexico, reaches Canyon Diablo, Arizona.
 Transcaucasian Railway reaches Baku on the Caspian Sea.
 William Cornelius Van Horne becomes general manager of Canadian Pacific Railway.
 Minerva Car Works, later to become part of American Car and Foundry, is founded in Minerva, Ohio.

Accidents

Births

February births 
 February 4 – L. B. Billinton, Locomotive Engineer for London, Brighton and South Coast Railway 1912–1923 (d. 1954).

August births 
 August 25 – Richard Paul Wagner, locomotive designer for Deutsche Reichsbahn 1922–1942 (d. 1953).

September births 
 September 19 – Oliver Bulleid, chief mechanical engineer of the Southern Railway (Great Britain) 1937–1948, born in New Zealand (d. 1970).

Deaths

December deaths
 December 6 – Alfred Escher, Swiss railway promoter (b. 1819)
 December 24 – Charles Vincent Walker English railway telegraph engineer (b. 1812).

Unknown date deaths
 John Cooke, superintendent of Rogers Locomotive and Machine Works and founder of Cooke Locomotive Works (b. 1824).
 John P. Laird, Scottish engineer who designed and patented the two-wheel equalized leading truck for steam locomotives (b. 1826).

References
 Dodge, Richard V. (November 15, 1959), Perris and its Railroad: California Southern Railway history.  Retrieved August 15, 2005.
 (1913), History of the Lake Shore and Michigan Southern Railway Company. Retrieved August 23, 2005.
 Rivanna Chapter National Railway Historical Society (2005), This Month in Railroad History – August.  Retrieved August 22, 2005.
 Santa Fe Railroad (1945), Along Your Way, Rand McNally, Chicago, Illinois.